The Valais shrew (Sorex antinorii) is a species of mammal in the family Soricidae.

Taxonomy
Its karyotype has 2n = 24/25 and FN = 40. Until 2002, it was viewed as a chromosomal race of the wide-ranging and karyotypically polymorphic species S. araneus.

Distribution
It is found in all of Italy except southern Apulia, in southeastern France, and in southern Switzerland.

References

External links
 
 
Biolib
Zipcodezoo

Sorex
Mammals described in 1840
Taxa named by Charles Lucien Bonaparte